Pankaj Berry (born 8 January 1956) is an Indian film and television actor.

He did his post-graduation from Department of Indian Theatre, Panjab University, Chandigarh where he acted in many theatre productions of the department. His first major break came with a television series Gul Gulshan Gulfaam on Doordarshan in 1987. College Girl was his first Bollywood film. He went on to appear in many television series and films after that. He has first appeared in a small role in Govind Nihalani's Tamas, in which he played role of son of Surekha Sikri. He gained wide popularity through the role of Tathacharya in Tenali Rama. He was last seen in the character of Balraj Solanki in Kaatelal & Sons.

Filmography

Television

References 

Living people
Indian male film actors
Indian male television actors
Punjabi people
1966 births
Indian male soap opera actors
20th-century Indian male actors
21st-century Indian male actors
Place of birth missing (living people)